Sayyid Ali Tirmizi, more commonly known as Pir Baba, was a Naqvi Sayyid, and a Sufi who settled in Buner (present-day Khyber Pakhtunkhwa, Pakistan) among the Yusufzai Pashtuns. He was probably born in 908 AH (1502 CE), in Fergana (present-day Uzbekistan), of Sayyid descent, died in AH 991 (1583 CE). He was a supporter of the Mughal emperor Babar, and was an opponent of Bayazid Pir Roshan.

It is claimed that Pir Baba was the son of Sayyid Qamar Ali, who was in emperor Babur's army and had come down to Delhi as the governor of the Indian state. His mother was of Uzbek origin. Baba was more inclined towards Islamic studies. Baba supposedly married a sister of Daulat Khan a Yusufzai; a respected Pashtun from Buner.

He had 2 sons, Sayyid Habibullāh Shaah and Sayyid Mustafa Shaah.
Anwar Baig Baghi, a descendant of Pir Baba in his 12th generation, made news because "he could read only up to fifth grade but he penned down over 50 books on a variety of topics." Shodago Baba Ji was also one of his descendants. His descendants are also known as Tirmizi Sayyids.

Lineage
Sayyid Ali Tirmizi was a descendant of Muhammad through Sultan Sadaat Sayyid Ali Akbar bin Imam Hasan al-Askari, his family tree lineage:

Shrine (Mazar)
Baba's grave and shrine is in Pacha Killay village in the mountainous Buner District of present-day Khyber Pakhtunkhwa.

The shrine was closed by the Taliban temporarily.

Urs Mubarak 
The annual Urs or Pilgrimage of Hazrat Pir Baba is celebrated from 24 to 26 Rajab of the Islamic calendar every year in Buner.

References

People from Buner District
Indian Sufis
Sufi saints
Hashemite people
1502 births
1583 deaths